KINO (1230 AM, "Route 66 Radio") is a radio station licensed to serve Winslow, Arizona, United States. The station is owned by Sunflower Communications, Inc. It airs a country music format.  Other programming consists of local news, weather, and sports. Especially popular are live broadcasts of Winslow High School Bulldog Sports.

The station was assigned the KINO call letters by the Federal Communications Commission.

References

External links
 FCC History Cards for KINO

INO
Winslow, Arizona
Country radio stations in the United States
Mass media in Navajo County, Arizona